Dawn is an unincorporated community in northern Richland Township, Darke County, Ohio, United States.  It lies at the intersection of U.S. Route 127 with Burch Road.  It is located between the villages of Ansonia and Versailles, approximately 8 miles (12.75 km) north of Greenville, the county seat of Darke County.

History
Dawn was originally called Nevada, and under the latter name had its start in 1854 when a sawmill was built there. A post office called Dawn was established in 1857, and remained in operation until 1935.

References

External links
Darke County Genealogical Researchers Website

Unincorporated communities in Darke County, Ohio
Unincorporated communities in Ohio
1854 establishments in Ohio
Populated places established in 1854